Rabarama, pseudonym of Paola Epifani, (born August 22, 1969) is an Italian contemporary artist.

Artistic practice
Rabarama creates sculptures and paintings of men, women and hybrid creatures, often in eccentric poses.
The skins of her subjects are always decorated with patterns, symbols, letters, glyphs and other kind of figures, in a great variety of forms.

Public art and internet art
Rabarama monumental sculptures have been exhibited in many public spaces

Paris, Place de la Sorbonne, Rue Soufflot, Place du Pantheon
Reggio Calabria, seaside
Shanghai, People's Plaza
Miami, Mizner Park
Florence, Piazza Pitti- Giardino di Boboli-Giardino delle Scuderie Reali- Complesso Le Pagliere
Cannes, La croisette

Hi-tech and new media
In 2011 the world's first 360° video mapping on a sculpture was realized on a Rabarama's work called "Bozzolo" and exhibited live in Florence, Italy.

Gallery

Bibliography
"Rabarama" (by V. Baradel, L. M. Barbero, G. Granzotto, L. Pagnucco Salvemini; Italy. Electa, 2000) 
"Rabarama. Colori e Forme" (by G. Granzotto, L. M. Barbero; Italy, Sant’Ivo alla Sapienza, 2000) 
"Rabarama. Sculture Monumentali" (by D. Magnetti, L. M. Barbero; Italy, Palazzo Bricherasio, 2001) 
"Trans–formation" (by V. Baradel, L. M. Barbero; France, Galerie Enrico Navarra, 2001) 
"Beijing International" (by V. Sanfo; China, National Art Museum of China, 2003) 
"Sculpture Exhibition of Rabarama" (by F. Dian, X. Xiao Feng; China, He Xiangning museum, 2004) 
"Rabarama ANTICOnforme" (by L.Beatrice, George Bolge; Italy, Vecchiato ed., 2011)

References

External links
Artist's website

1969 births
Living people
20th-century Italian sculptors
20th-century Italian women artists
21st-century Italian sculptors
21st-century Italian women artists
Painters from Rome
Italian contemporary artists
Italian multimedia artists
Italian women painters
Pseudonymous artists
Postmodern artists
Italian women sculptors